Bumamuru Football Club, also known as Bumamuru Standard or simply as Bumamuru, is a Burundian professional football club based in Buganda, the Cibitoke Province. The club was founded on 31 March 2014 and currently competes in Ligue A, the top flight of Burundi football, after succeeding in the promotion at the end of the 2017–18 Liga B season. Bumamuru plays its home matches at the Stade Urunani in Buganda. The club colours are green and white and the badge of the club has the Burundi map and its vegetation.

History 
In the 2017–18 season, Bumamuru finished third in Group A of Ligue B, Burundi's second division and qualified for the promotion playoff as the 2nd placed team, Transport FC, was subsequently disqualified. Bumamuru won the promotion against Les Eléphants FC after 1–1 on aggregate and 5–4 at penalty shoot-out.

In the first Ligue A season, Bumamuru managed a good fifth-place in the league table with 44 points. In the following two seasons the green and white finished eleventh twice and won the Coupe du Président de la République in 2021, beating Flambeau du Centre 3–1 in the final.

The next season saw the debut of Bumamuru in continental competitions, but were eliminated in the first round of the CAF Confederation Cup by Congolese side Diables Noirs 0–1 on aggregate. The team finished the Liga A season on third-place after was on top of the league involved in the title fight, but a string of bad results saw them dropping down at two points behind champions, Flambeau du Centre. The club won their second Coupe du Président de la République in 2022, beating again 3–1 Flambeau du Centre and qualify for the CAF Confederation Cup.

Honours 
Coupe du Président de la République
Winners (2): 2021, 2022

Performance in CAF competitions

Squad

Management and staff

References 

Football clubs in Burundi
2014 establishments in Burundi
Association football clubs established in 2014